El Pentágono is a compilation album by the reggaeton producer and owner of Update Music, Revol, although the album was presented by Don Omar and released on March 27, 2007.

Track listing

Charts

Weekly charts

Sales and certifications

References

Don Omar compilation albums
2007 compilation albums
Reggaeton albums
Albums produced by Luny Tunes
Albums produced by Rafy Mercenario
Albums produced by Nely